Modesto is an unincorporated community in Washington Township, Monroe County, in the U.S. state of Indiana.

History
A post office was established at Modesto in 1892, and remained in operation until it was discontinued in 1903. According to Ronald L. Baker, the community was probably named after Modesto, California.

Geography

References

Unincorporated communities in Monroe County, Indiana
Unincorporated communities in Indiana
Bloomington metropolitan area, Indiana